Aerotropolis railway station is a proposed station on the Western Sydney Airport line that will serve Badgerys Creek. Scheduled to open in 2026, it will be the terminus of the line.

References

Proposed Sydney Metro stations
Railway stations scheduled to open in 2026